The Doric Tetrapolis comprised a set of four closely situated cities in the valley of the Pindus River in the region of Doris in ancient Greece.  The four cities were Erineus, Boium, Cytinium, and Pindus. (Strabo x. p. 427.)

External links
 

Cities in ancient Greece
Doris (Greece)